Alphonse is the French variant of the given name Alphons. People called Alphonse include:

In arts, entertainment, and media

Film, television, and theatre
 Alphonse Beni, Cameroonian actor and movie director
 Alphonse Boudard (1925–2000), French novelist and playwright
 Alphonse Ouimet (1908–1988), Canadian television pioneer and president of the Canadian Broadcasting Corporation from 1958 to 1967
 Alphonse Royer (1803–1875), French author, dramatist and theatre manager

Music
 Alphonse "Bois Sec" Ardoin (1915–2007), American accordionist
 Alphonse Duvernoy (1842–1907), French pianist and composer
 Alphonse Hasselmans (1845–1912), Belgian-born French harpist, composer and pedagogue
 Alphonse Joseph (composer), Indian film score composer
 Alphonse Martin (1884–1947), Canadian organist, pianist and music educator
 Alphonse Mouzon (1948–2016), American jazz fusion drummer and percussionist
 Alphonse Picou (1878–1961), American early jazz clarinetist
 Alphonse Trent (1905–1959), American jazz pianist and territory band leader
 Alphonse Varney (1811–1879), French conductor

Plastic arts
 Alphonse Balat (1819–1895), Belgian architect
 Alphonse Colas (1818–1887), French painter
 Alphonse de Cailleux (1788–1876), French painter, connoisseur, arts administrator and director of the Musée du Louvre
 Alphonse-Marie-Adolphe de Neuville (1835–1885), French Academic painter
 Alphonse Giroux (1775–1848), French painter
 Alphonse Kann (1870–1948), prominent French art collector of Jewish heritage
 Alphonse Lami (1822–1867), French sculptor
 Alphonse Laverrière (1872–1954), Swiss architect
 Alphonse Legros (1837–1911), French painter, etcher and sculptor
 Alphonse Mucha (1860–1939), Czech Art Nouveau painter and decorative artist
 Alphonse Osbert (1857–1939), French Symbolist painter

Writing and journalism
 Alphonse Allais (1854–1905), French writer and humorist
 Alphonse Boudard (1925–2000), French novelist and playwright
 Alphonse Daudet (1840–1897), French novelist
 Alphonse de Châteaubriant (1877–1951), French writer
 Alphonse de Lamartine (1790–1869), French writer, poet and politician
 Joseph-Alphonse Esménard (1770–1811), French poet
 Henri-François-Alphonse Esquiros (1812–1876), French writer
 Donatien Alphonse François, Marquis de Sade (1740–1814), French aristocrat, revolutionary, politician and writer famous for his libertine sexuality and lifestyle
 Auguste Joseph Alphonse Gratry (1805–1872), French author and theologian
 Victor-Alphonse Huard (1853–1929), French-Canadian churchman, naturalist, writer and editor
 Jean-Baptiste Alphonse Karr (1808–1890), French critic, journalist and novelist
 Alphonse Lemerre (1838–1912), French editor and publisher
 Alphonse-Télesphore Lépine (1855–1943), journalist, printer and political figure in Quebec
 Jean-Baptiste-Alphonse Lusignan (1843–1893), French-Canadian writer
 Guillaume-Alphonse Nantel (1852–1909), Canadian lawyer, journalist, author, newspaper owner and politician
 Alphonse Rabbe (1784–1829), French writer, historian, critic and journalist
 Alphonse Royer (1803–1875), French author, dramatist and theatre manager
 Alphonse Tavan (1833–1905), French Provençal poet
 Alphonse Toussenel (1803–1885), French writer and journalist

In business and finance
 Alphonse Bertrand (1846–1926), merchant and political figure in New Brunswick
 Louis-Alphonse Boyer (1839–1916), Quebec merchant and political figure
 Alphonse-Arthur Miville Déchêne (1848–1902), lumber merchant and political figure in Quebec
 Alphonse James de Rothschild (1827–1905), French financier, vineyard owner, art collector, philanthropist and racehorse owner and breeder
 Alphonse Desjardins (co-operator) (1854–1920), founder of Mouvement Desjardins credit unions
 Édouard Alphonse James de Rothschild (1868–1949), French financier
 Alphonse Raymond (1884–1958), Quebec businessman, financier and public official

In engineering and industrial design
 Alphonse Chapanis (1917–2002), American pioneer in the field of industrial design
 Camille Alphonse Faure (1840–1898), French chemical engineer
 Alphonse Loubat (1799–1866), French inventor who developed improvements in tram and rail equipment
 Alphonse Munchen (1850–1917), Luxembourgian engineer and politician
 Alphonse Pénaud (1850–1880), French pioneer of aviation
 Alphonse Poitevin (1819–1882), French chemist, photographer and civil engineer
 Alphonse Sagebien (1807–1892), French hydrological engineer

In government, law, military, and politics

Africa

Congo
 Alphonse Massamba-Débat (1921–1977), political figure of the Republic of the Congo who led the country from 1963 until 1968
 Claude Alphonse Nsilou (born 1954), Congolese politician
 Alphonse Poaty-Souchlaty (born 1941), politician of the Republic of the Congo

Other African countries
 Alphonse Alley (1930–1987), Beninese army officer and political figure
 Alphonse Barancira, former minister for Human Rights, Constitutional Reform and Relations with the National Assembly of Burundi
 Alphonse-Marie Kadege, vice-President of Burundi from 30 April 2003 to 11 November 2004
 Alphonse Kotiga (contemporary), Chadian military officer and politician

Europe

France
 Alphonse de Lamartine (1790–1869), French writer, poet and politician
 Donatien Alphonse François, Marquis de Sade (1740–1814), French aristocrat, revolutionary, politician and writer famous for his libertine sexuality and lifestyle
 Alphonse Joseph Georges (1875–1951), French army officer
 Ferdinand-Alphonse Hamelin (1796–1864), French admiral
 Alphonse Henri, comte d'Hautpoul (1789–1865), Prime Minister of France from 31 October 1849 to 10 April 1851 during the French Second Republic
 Alphonse Juin (1888–1967), Marshal of France
 Camille Alphonse Trézel (1780–1860), French général de division, Minister for War and peer of France during the July Monarchy

Other European countries
 Alphonse Berns (born 1952), Luxembourgian diplomat and current Ambassador to Belgium and Permanent Representative to NATO
 Alphonse de Tonty (ca. 1659–1727), Italian officer who served under the French explorer Cadillac
 Alphonse Munchen (1850–1917)), Luxembourgian engineer and politician

North America

Canada
 Alphonse Bernier (1861–1944), Canadian lawyer, judge and provincial politician
 Alphonse Bertrand (1846–1926), merchant and political figure in New Brunswick
 Louis-Alphonse Boyer (1839–1916), Quebec merchant and political figure
 Cuthbert-Alphonse Chênevert (1859–1920), lawyer and political figure in Quebec
 Alphonse-Arthur Miville Déchêne (1848–1902), lumber merchant and political figure in Quebec
 Alphonse Desjardins (politician) (1841–1912), mayor of Montreal and Canadian cabinet minister
 Alphonse Fournier (1893–1961), Canadian politician
 Christophe-Alphonse Geoffrion (1843–1899), Canadian lawyer, professor and politician
 Joseph-Alphonse-Anaclet Habel (1895–1979), Canadian politician
 Alphonse Alfred Clément Larivière (1842–1925), Canadian politician and journalist
 Alphonse-Télesphore Lépine (1855–1943), journalist, printer and political figure in Quebec
 Guillaume-Alphonse Nantel (1852–1909), Canadian lawyer, journalist, author, newspaper owner and politician
 Charles Alphonse Pantaléon Pelletier (1837–1911), Canadian lawyer, militia officer, politician, publisher, judge and the ninth Lieutenant Governor of Quebec
 Alphonse Raymond (1884–1958), Quebec businessman, financier and public official
 William Ferdinand Alphonse Turgeon (1877–1969), Canadian politician, judge and diplomat
 Alphonse Verville (1864–1921), Canadian politician and trade unionist

United States
 Alphonse Girandy (1868–1941), United States Navy sailor
 Alphonse J. Jackson (born 1927), retired educator and former member of the Louisiana House of Representatives
 Alphonse Roy (1897–1967), American Representative from New Hampshire

In organized crime
 Alphonse Attardi (1892–1970), New York mobster
 Alphonse "Al" Capone (1899–1947), Italian-American gangster who led a Prohibition-era crime syndicate
 Alphonse D'Arco (born 1932), New York mobster
 Alphonse Gangitano (1957–1998), Italian Australian organised crime identity from Templestowe, a suburb of Melbourne
 Alphonse Indelicato (1931–1981), powerful caporegime in New York City's Bonanno crime family
 Alphonse Malangone (born 1936), New York City mobster and caporegime in the Genovese crime family
 Alphonse Persico, former acting boss of the Colombo crime family from the 1980s and 1990s

In religion and mysticism
 Alphonse Constant (1810–1875), French occult author and purported magician
 Pierre-Marie-Alphonse Favier (1837–1905), controversial Roman Catholic Lazarite Vicar Apostolic of Northern Chi-Li, China
 Alphonse Gallegos (1931–1991),  American Roman Catholic bishop
 Alphonse Joseph Glorieux (1844–1917), Belgian missionary Roman Catholic bishop
 Auguste Joseph Alphonse Gratry (1805–1872), French author and theologian
 Alphonse Magnien (1837–1902), the superior at St. Mary's Seminary and University in Baltimore, Maryland from 1878 to 1902
 Alphonse Mingana (1878–1937), Assyrian theologian, historian, orientalist and former priest
 Marie-Alphonse Ratisbonne (1814–1884), French Jesuit Catholic priest and missionary
 Alphonse-Louis du Plessis de Richelieu (1582–1653), French Carthusian, bishop and Cardina
 Alphonse James Schladweiler (1902–1996), American prelate of the Roman Catholic Church
 Alphonse John Smith (1883–1935), American bishop in the Catholic Church

In science, medicine, and academia

Cultural sciences
 Adolph Francis Alphonse Bandelier (1840–1914), American archaeologist
 Alphonse Mingana (1878–1937), Assyrian theologian, historian, orientalist and former priest
 Alphonse Pinart (1852–1911), French explorer, philologist and ethnographer
 Alphonse Rabbe (1784–1829), French writer, historian, critic and journalist
 Alphonse Roque-Ferrier (1844–1907), French philologist and historian of the Occitan language

Geology and earth science
 Alphonse Briart (1825–1898), Belgian coal mine supervisor and geologist
 François-Alphonse Forel (1841–1912), Swiss scientist, founder of limnology
 Alphonse Francois Renard (1842–1903), Belgian geologist and petrographer

Life sciences and medicine
 Alphonse Bertillon (1853–1914), French police officer and biometrics researcher who created the field of anthropometry
 Alphonse Pyramus de Candolle (1806–1893), French-Swiss botanist
 Alphonse Dochez (1882–1964), American physician and disease researcher
 Alphonse Guérin (1816–1895), French surgeon
 Victor-Alphonse Huard (1853–1929), French-Canadian churchman, naturalist, writer and editor
 Alphonse Hustache (1872–1949), French entomologist
 Charles Louis Alphonse Laveran (1845–1922), French physician
 Alphonse Milne-Edwards (1835–1900), French mammalologist, ornithologist and carcinologist

Other disciplines
 Alphonse Borrelly (1842–1926), French astronomer
 Alphonse de Polignac (1817–1890), French mathematician
 Christophe-Alphonse Geoffrion (1843–1899), Canadian lawyer, professor and politician
 Pierre Alphonse Laurent (1813–1854), French mathematician
 Alphonse Lavallée (1791–1873), the founder of the École Centrale Paris
 Alphonse Magnien (1837–1902), the superior at St. Mary's Seminary and University in Baltimore, Maryland from 1878 to 1902
 Alphonse Poitevin (1819–1882), French chemist, photographer and civil engineer

In sport

Football (soccer)
 Alphonse Areola (born 1993), French football player
 Alphonse Decorte (1909–1977), Belgian football player
 Alphonse Leweck (born 1981), Luxembourgian football player
 Alphonse Renier, Belgian football player
 Alphonse Six (1890–1914), Belgian football player
 Alphonse Tchami (born 1971), retired Cameroonian football player
 Alphonse Yombi (born 1969), former Cameroonian football player

Winter sports
 Alphonse Hörning, Swiss bobsledder
 Alphonse Jetté (1887–?), Canadian professional ice hockey player
 Alphonse Lacroix (1897–1973), American ice hockey goaltender

Other sports
 Alphonse Antoine (1915–1999), French professional road bicycle racer
 Alphonse Burnand (1896–1981), American sailor
 Alphonse Castex (1899–1969), French rugby union player
 Alphonse Dotson (born 1943), former American football player
 Alphonse Ducatillon, Belgian tug of war competitor
 Alphonse Gemuseus (1898–?), Swiss horse rider
 Alphonse Halimi ("La Petite Terreur"; 1932–2006), French world champion bantamweight boxer
 Alphonse Kirchhoffer (1873–1913), French fencer
 Alphonse Martin (water polo) (born 1930), Belgian water polo player
 Alphonse Ruckstuhl (1901–?), Swiss Olympic fencer
 Alphonse Schepers (1907–1984), Belgian racing cyclist
 Alphonse Van Mele (1891–1972), Belgian gymnast
 Alphonse Yanghat (born 1957), Congolese Olympic sprinter
 Phonney Martin (1845–1943), American baseball player

In other fields
 Alphonse James de Rothschild (1827–1905), French financier, vineyard owner, art collector, philanthropist and racehorse owner and breeder
 Alphonse Goetz (1865–1934), French chess master
 Alphonse Le Gastelois (1914–2012), a Jerseyman who became a hermit on the Écréhous islands to avoid persecution

Fictional characters
 Alphonse and Gaston, an American comic strip by Frederick Burr Opper, featuring a bumbling pair of Frenchmen with a penchant for politeness
 Alphonse Elric, a fictional character in the anime/manga series Fullmetal Alchemist
 Alphonse "Big Boy" Caprice, a fictional character by Chester Gould in the comic strip Dick Tracy
 Alphonse Bearwalker, a character in the television comedy NTSF:SD:SUV::
 Alphonse Huggins, a character in the series Titanic by Gordon Korman
 Alphonse, a fictional character in the video game Owlboy.

See also

 Alphonse (surname)
 Alfonso (disambiguation)

French masculine given names